is a Japanese professional sumo wrestler from Ibaraki Prefecture. He made his debut in November 2010 and reached the top makuuchi division in November 2020, just after turning 30 years of age. He wrestles for Tatsunami stable. His highest rank is maegashira 10. His shikona is a reference to the Aqua World aquarium in his home town.

Career
Akua comes from a family of car dealers, and he took exams at a vocational school to become a certified auto mechanic. Joining Tatsunami stable in November 2010, just a few months later his hometown of Ōarai, Ibaraki was badly hit by the 2011 Tōhoku earthquake and tsunami. He considered quitting sumo and returning home to help out, but was persuaded by his father (who had won a national wrestling competition at junior high school) to continue. Originally known as Toyononami, he changed his shikona to Akua in March 2014, after the Aqua World aquarium in his hometown.

Akua made his  debut in November 2020, shortly after turning 30 years of age. He secured a winning record in his top division debut by winning his eighth bout on the fourteenth day, defeating Kotoekō.

In December 2020, he was one of several members of his stable to test positive for COVID-19. He took part in the following January 2021 tournament but could only score 5–10 and was demoted back to jūryō. In November 2021 Akua was promoted to the top division for the third time, and on this occasion managed a winning record, securing his eighth victory on Day 13. In January 2022 he was promoted to his highest rank to date of  10, but scored only four wins against eleven losses.

He has twice been involved in car accidents while a passenger travelling to the Ryōgoku Kokugikan, being rear-ended on the fifth day of the November 2020 tournament and suffering whiplash, and being hit by an uninsured car while leaving a toll booth on the expressway during the March 2021 tournament, resulting in a sprain of his cervical spine.

Fighting style
Akua is an oshi-sumo specialist, who prefers pushing and thrusting techniques. He also has experience in judo, and is fond of kakenage, or "hooking inner thigh throw." 
In the September 2021 tournament, four of his seven wins through Day 8 were by this technique. He admitted after the tournament that he may have overused the move and that his opponents were beginning to read him.

Career record

See also
Glossary of sumo terms
List of active sumo wrestlers

References

External links
 

1990 births
Living people
Japanese sumo wrestlers
Sportspeople from Ibaraki Prefecture
Tatsunami stable sumo wrestlers